Selaginella uncinata, the blue spikemoss, peacock moss, peacock spikemoss, or spring blue spikemoss, is a species of plant in the Selaginellaceae family.

It is widely cultivated outdoors along the Gulf Coast of the United States and in greenhouses and nurseries. It is a native of southern China and is closely allied to Selaginella delicatula (Desvaux ex Poiret) Alston, also in part from China.

References

External links
 
 

uncinata